Borsonella abrupta is a species of sea snail, a marine gastropod mollusk in the family Borsoniidae.

Description

Distribution
This species occurs in the Pacific Ocean off the Galapagos Islands.

References

 McLean, J.H. & Poorman, R. (1971) New species of tropical Eastern Pacific Turridae. The Veliger, 14, 89–113.

External links
  Bouchet P., Kantor Yu.I., Sysoev A. & Puillandre N. (2011) A new operational classification of the Conoidea. Journal of Molluscan Studies 77: 273–308.
 

abrupta
Gastropods described in 1971